Jennie Simms (born April 21, 1994) is an American -Israeli professional basketball player for the Phoenix Mercury of the Women's National Basketball Association (WNBA) and the Israel women's national basketball team. She played college basketball for 3 seasons at Old Dominion and 1 season at West Virginia. Simms was drafted by the Washington Mystics of the WNBA in the 2017 WNBA Draft. She has played for the Mystics, Indiana Fever, and the Phoenix Mercury.

College career

West Virginia
Simms was rated as the 87th overall incoming recruit by ESNPU HoopGurlz 100 and committed to play for West Virginia. Simms played in 8 games for the Mountaineers during her freshman year and averaged 3.1 points. Her last game was on December 4, 2012. She ultimately decided to transfer from West Virginia stating that "I was really miserable there. I was homesick, and it made me get sick."

Old Dominion
Simms decided to transfer to Old Dominion and sat out the 2013–2014 season due to NCAA Transfer Rules.

During her first season competing at ODU, Simms was named the Conference USA Newcomer of the Year. Simms was a scoring threat for the Monarchs. She dropped 45 points against Florida International. She finished the 14–15 season averaging 19.3 points, 6.7 rebounds, and 3.6 assists.

In the 2015–16 season, Simms continued to be a tough player for other teams. Simms became the 6th player in ODU history to score 1,000 career points in just two season. She also led the entire league in scoring at 22.2 points, while also finishing in 5th for overall field goal percentage at .460. Simms was suspended from the team in late November after an incident involving another teammate during a tournament in the U.S. Virgin Islands, and was reinstated in late December. Simms was named to the C-USA All-Conference First Team for the 2nd year in a row for her efforts.

In her senior season, Simms increased all her major statistical categories. She averaged 26.0 points, 8.0 points, and 4.2 assists. Simms was named the C-USA Player of the Year, becoming the first ODU player to win the award since 2002. Simms' scoring continued to increase, as she was the 2nd leading scorer in the entire nation. Her scoring average of 26.0 broke a ODU school record previously held by Anne Donovan since 1980–1981.

College statistics

Professional career

Washington Mystics
In the 2017 WNBA Draft, Simms was taken 18th overall by the Washington Mystics. Simms played in 10 career games for the Mystics in 2017, scoring a high of 4 points on June 9, 2017, against the Minnesota Lynx. On July 27, 2017, the Mystics waived Simms from their roster.

Indiana Fever
In August 2017, the Indiana Fever signed Simms to help out as they were down multiple players to injury. Simms played in 4 games to finish out the 2017 season with the Fever. She scored a new high of 9 points against Minnesota.

Simms re-signed with the Fever as a training camp contract for the 2018 season, but ultimately didn't make the team and was waived on May 4, 2018.

Phoenix Mercury
Simms since a training camp deal with the Phoenix Mercury on March 18, 2022. She was cut just before the 2022 season opener, but was brought back on a Hardship Contract, as the Mercury were missing players due to injury and Overseas commitments. On May 10, 2022, Simms was released from the hardship contract. Simms returned to the Mercury on June 9, 2022, on another hardship contract. She was released from her hardship on June 23, 2022, after Sophie Cunningham returned from her injury. She was once again brought back on June 27, 2022, when the Mercury signed her again.

WNBA career statistics

Regular season 

|-
| style="text-align:left;"| 2017
| style="text-align:left;"| Washington
| 10 || 0 || 5.0 || .167 || .000 || .800 || 1.1 || 0.6 || 0.2 || 0.2 || 0.3 || 1.2
|-
| style="text-align:left;"| 2017
| style="text-align:left;"| Indiana
| 4 || 0 || 13.5 || .308 || .333 || .500 || 1.3 || 0.5 || 0.5 || 0.0 || 0.8 || 2.8
|-
| style="text-align:left;"| 2022
| style="text-align:left;"| Phoenix
| 23 || 4 || 13.2 || .476 || .211 || .789 || 2.2 || 0.9 || 0.5 || 0.0 || 1.0 || 3.4
|-
| style="text-align:left;"| Career
| style="text-align:left;"| 2 year, 3 teams
| 37 || 4 || 11.0 || .409 || .214 || .774 || 1.8 || 0.8 || 0.4 || 0.1 || 0.68|| 2.8

Playoffs

|-
| style="text-align:left;"| 2022
| style="text-align:left;"| Phoenix
| 2 || 2 || 24.5 || .267 || .200 || .200 || 3.0 || 2.0 || 0.0 || 0.0 || 1.0 || 5.5
|-
| style="text-align:left;"| Career
| style="text-align:left;"| 1 year, 1 team
| 2 || 2 || 24.5 || .267 || .200 || .200 || 3.0 || 2.0 || 0.0 || 0.0 || 1.0 || 5.5

References

External links
WNBA bio
Old Dominion Monarchs bio

1994 births
Living people
American women's basketball players
Basketball players from Maryland
Guards (basketball)
Old Dominion Monarchs women's basketball players
Washington Mystics draft picks
Washington Mystics players
Indiana Fever players
Phoenix Mercury players
People from Accokeek, Maryland